George Crawford may refer to:

George Crawford (Australian politician) (1926–2012), Victorian state politician
George Crawford (Canadian politician) (1793–1870), founding member of the Canadian Senate
George Crawford (cricketer) (1890–1975), English first-class cricketer
George Crawford (footballer) (1905–1975), English footballer
George A. Crawford (1827–1891), Kansas politician
George W. Crawford (1798–1872), United States politician from Georgia
George Crawford (American businessman) (1861–1935), American businessman, founder and executive with Columbia Gas & Electric
George Williamson Crawford (1877–1972), Connecticut lawyer
George Crawford (baseball), Major League Baseball outfielder, 1890
George Gordon Crawford (1869–1936), American industrialist

See also
George Crawford Hyndman (1796–1867), Irish auctioneer and biologist
George Crawford McKindsey (1829–1901), Canadian politician
George Crawford Platt (1842–1912), Medal of Honor recipient in the American Civil War